The 2010–11 Santos Laguna season was the 64th professional season of Mexico's top-flight football league. The season is split into two tournaments—the Torneo Apertura and the Torneo Clausura—each with identical formats and each contested by the same eighteen teams. Santos Laguna will begin their season on July 24, 2010 against Atlante, Santos Laguna will play their homes games on Saturdays at 7pm local time.

Torneo Apertura

Squad

Out on loan 

(to Alacranes de Durango)
(to San Luis F.C.)
(to Albinegros de Orizaba)
(to C.F. La Piedad)
(to Club Universidad de Guadalajara)
(to Club de Gimnasia y Esgrima La Plata)

(to Irapuato FC)
(to Club Universidad de Guadalajara)
(to Club Universidad de Guadalajara)
(to Mérida F.C.)
(to Chiapas)
(to Tiburones Rojos de Veracruz)

Apertura 2010 results

Regular season

Final Phase 

Santos Laguna won 2-1 on aggregate

Santos Laguna won 5-4 on aggregate

Monterrey won 5-3 on aggregate

CONCACAF Champions League

Transfers

In

Out

Goalscorers

Results

Results summary

Results by round

Torneo Clausura

Squad 
As of July 2, 2010

 *

Out on loan

Clausura 2011 results

Regular season

CONCACAF Champions League

Goalscorers

Results

Results summary

Results by round

References 

2010–11 Primera División de México season
Mexican football clubs 2010–11 season
2010-11